Mariana Burgos (born ) is an Argentine female volleyball player.

She was part of the Argentina women's national volleyball team at the 2003 FIVB Volleyball World Grand Prix.

At club level she played for UEP.

References

1977 births
Living people
Argentine women's volleyball players